Bunny O'Hare is a 1971 American comedy film directed by Gerd Oswald, starring Bette Davis and Ernest Borgnine. The screenplay by Coslough Johnson and Stanley Z. Cherry focuses on a pair of senior citizens who, disguised as hippies, engage in a crime spree.

Plot
The title character, a widow whose savings have been depleted by her selfish, middle-aged children, Lulu and Ad, finds herself homeless when the bank forecloses on her mortgage. She becomes friendly with Bill Green, an aging itinerant salvaging the house's plumbing, who she soon discovers is really fugitive bank robber William Gruenwald. Hoping to recoup her losses from the bank that took her home, Bunny blackmails Bill into teaching her how to rob the institution in exchange for keeping his identity a secret. She wears a long blonde wig, oversized hat, and sunglasses, while he dons a fake beard, leather vest, and bell-bottom pants, and the two pull off the caper and escape on a 250cc Triumph TR25W Trophy motorcycle. Buoyed by their success, Bunny convinces Bill to join her in more heists, and the different modus operandi they use – setting free a canary to distract the guard, setting off smoke bombs – make it difficult for police lieutenant Horace Greeley and criminologist R. J. Hart to profile their suspects.

Cast
Bette Davis as Bunny O'Hare
Ernest Borgnine as Bill Green
Jack Cassidy as Lieutenant Greeley
Jay Robinson as John C. Rupert
Joan Delaney as R. J. Hart
John Astin as Ad
Reva Rose as Lulu

Production
The working titles for the film were Bunny and Claude, Bunny, Betty and Claude, and Bunny and Billy. The film marked the second on-screen pairing of Bette Davis and Ernest Borgnine, who co-starred in The Catered Affair in 1956. The American International Pictures release was filmed partially on location in Belen and Albuquerque. New Mexico Governor David F. Cargo made a cameo appearance as a state trooper. 

The film led to two lawsuits for American International Pictures. Davis, who had script approval, was upset with changes made in editing. Davis had insisted on using an expletive in the film that would have garnered an R rating, so Samuel  Z. Arkoff hired an actress who did a Bette Davis impression to reloop the dialogue with a less objectionable word.  Davis sued the company for loss of income and damage to her career for changing the film into a "slapstick" production instead of the "humorous social commentary" for which she had signed. The suit eventually was dropped.  Writer Cherry sued for $13,400, the balance of his fee, and also asked for 5% of the film's net profits. The outcome is unknown.

Soundtrack
The soundtrack includes the following vocals:

"Monday Man", written by Billy Strange and Keith Roberts, performed by Billy Curb
"Right Or Wrong", written by Mack David and Billy Curb, performed by Billy Curb
"The Ballad Of Bunny O'Hare", written by Mack David and Billy Curb, performed by Billy Curb

Reception
Bette Davis was unhappy with the final film and sued AIP for $3.3 million in damages.

Critical reception
In his review in The New York Times, Vincent Canby described the film as "a silly, foolishly entertaining movie ... nonsense of a quite acceptable order, filled with absurd chases and stock characters who have been conceived and played with affection." Of its star he observed, "Miss Davis ... gives a performance that may be one of the funniest and most legitimate of her career."  In the Cleveland Press, Toni Mastroianni said, "Bette Davis and Ernest Borgnine play a Bonnie and Clyde of the Geritol set and the result is about as satisfying as a bad television show." Time Out London called it an "embarrassingly unfunny caper". According to TV Guide, "This clever script is ineptly directed by Oswald, who has no idea of how to embellish the comedy with pace, movement, or wit. Davis and Borgnine are excellent, though, showing that years of training and professionalism can overcome just about anything."

See also
 List of American films of 1971

References

External links
 Bunny O'Hare at the Internet Movie Database

1971 films
1970s crime comedy films
American crime comedy films
American International Pictures films
1970s English-language films
Films about old age
1971 comedy films
1970s American films